Consolate Feza Mwange (born 23 March 1985) is a Congolese handball player for Mikishi Lubumbashi and the DR Congo national team.

References

1985 births
Living people
African Games medalists in handball
African Games bronze medalists for DR Congo
Democratic Republic of the Congo female handball players
Competitors at the 2019 African Games
21st-century Democratic Republic of the Congo people